Frits van Turenhout (June 14, 1913 in Amsterdam – October 3, 2004 in Blaricum) was a Dutch sports journalist, appearing on both radio and television. He did this in a very solemn manner. He missed his own last broadcast due to an automobile accident he had on his way to the studio.

 

1913 births
2004 deaths
Dutch sports journalists
Dutch television presenters
Writers from Amsterdam
20th-century Dutch journalists